Sebastian Da Costa (born 1990 in Luanda, Angola), better known by his stage name Daco Junior, is a singer/songwriter, rapper and a record producer from Vaasa, Finland. Daco Junior debuted in December 2010 with the single "Sane", which is an official remake of The Ark's hit single "It Takes a Fool to Remain Sane".
The single was released through Daco Juniors own label Unidream Music and received widespread attention especially amongst Swedish-speaking media outlets in Finland.

Gravity

In July 2011, a little over half a year later Daco Junior released a follow up single "Gravity" through his own label Unidream Music as well. The single was chosen to a weekly "Hot or Not" radio program on YleX, where the listeners decide the hottest track of the week. Winning the weekly competition Daco Junior's "Gravity" earned its way to the playlist on Finlands national radio. Spent 15 weeks on top positions of the playlist in total and charted as number No. 1, two times consecutively. The single was eventually awarded as the most requested song of the year 2011, by Finlands national radio YleX.

Heartbeat Solo

In the very beginning of 2012 Daco Junior signed a record deal with Universal Music Finland. Released three more singles "Like An Astronaut", "Perfect Runaway" featuring Kristiina Wheeler and "How Far" featuring Madcon. Daco Junior released his first major label album "Heartbeat Solo" in February 2013.

Discography

Singles
Sane (2010)
Gravity (2011)
Like An Astronaut (2012)
Perfect Runaway (2012) feat. Kristiina Wheeler
How Far (2012) feat. Madcon

Albums
Heartbeat Solo (2013)

References

External links
Official website Daco Junior
Daco Junior on facebook

1990 births
Living people
Finnish male singer-songwriters
Finnish rappers
Finnish record producers
Finnish people of Angolan descent
21st-century Finnish male singers